West Chelborough is a village and civil parish  north west of Dorchester, in the Dorset district, in the county of Dorset, England. In 2001 the parish had a population of 42. The parish touches Corscombe and East Chelborough.

Features 
There are 6 listed buildings in West Chelborough. It has a church called St Andrew.

History 
The name "Chelborough" may mean 'Ceola's hill' or 'throat hill'. West Chelborough was recorded in the Domesday Book as Celberge/Celberga.

References 

 

Villages in Dorset
Civil parishes in Dorset
West Dorset District